Shamrock Rovers Football Club is a football club from Dublin, Ireland. They compete in the Premier Division of the League of Ireland. They are the most successful club in the history of Irish football, having won 16 League of Ireland titles and 24 FAI Cups. They have also won the League of Ireland Shield on 18 occasions and the League of Ireland Cup once. This chronological list comprises all those who have held the position of manager or coach at Shamrock Rovers since the club first delegated control of the senior team to a single person, rather than a selection committee. Interim managers are included, where known, as well as those who have been in permanent charge. Each manager's entry includes his dates of tenure and the team's overall competitive record, in terms of matches won, drawn and lost, while under his management.

List of managers
As of 1 January 2012.

Notes:
P - Total of played matches
W - Won matches
D - Drawn matches
L - Lost matches
GS - Goals scored
GA - Goals against
%W - Percentage of matches won (rounded to 2 decimal places)

Legend:
(int.) Managers on interim charge.

References

General
The Hoops by Paul Doolan and Robert Goggins

 
Shamrock Rovers